FAX.PLUS is a cloud-based online fax service based in Geneva, Switzerland that offers individuals and corporates a solution to send and receive fax online. FAX.PLUS is a sub-organization of Alohi which is founded in 2016 and supported by the state of Geneva through FONGIT (the Fondation Genevoise pour l’Innovation Technologique, a non-profit foundation financed by the Swiss Federal Commission for Technology and Innovation).

Platforms
FAX.PLUS is a cross-platform online fax service that enables users to send and receive fax from web, mobile, email or even Google G Suite. The app is available for both iOS and Android platforms. According to a report by the Daily Dot, FAX.PLUS web application comes with a user-friendly interface and without ads.

Google integration
FAX.PLUS supports the G Suite add-on which allows the user to send fax from Google Docs, Google Sheets, and the Chrome extension to send fax from Chrome browser.

API
The FAX.PLUS REST-based API enables third party developers and organizations to integrate online fax functionalities into their own software or program.

Slack integration
With FAX.PLUS Slack integration, users get notified of received faxes and the status of sent faxes in their Slack workspace.

Features
According to its website, the Fax files at rest are encrypted using 256-bit Advanced Encryption Standard (AES). FAX.PLUS has fax numbers available from 44 countries, and it can send faxes to over 150 countries. According to, Teltarif (magazine), it comes with a simple and intuitive interface and users can access all the functionalities easily. FAX.PLUS also includes a feature to use the smartphone’s camera to scan documents and add digital signature to them.

References

Companies based in Geneva
Telecommunications companies of Switzerland
Internet fax